The Subaru Memorial of Naples was a golf tournament on the LPGA Tour from 1999 to 2001. It was played at The Club at The Strand in Naples, Florida.

Winners
Subaru Memorial of Naples
2001 Sophie Gustafson
2000 Nancy Scranton

Naples LPGA Memorial
1999 Meg Mallon

References

External links
Tournament results at golfobserver.com

Former LPGA Tour events
Golf in Florida
Women's sports in Florida